Sansha (p Sānshā),  "Three Sands") usually refers to the disputed Chinese administration over various islands and submerged features in the South China Sea.

It may also refer to:

 Sansha, a former island of the Yangtze estuary now joined to Chongming Island